Gregory Richard "Greg" Apps is an Australian film casting consultant and actor. He cast Russell Crowe, Guy Pearce, Eric Bana, Sam Worthington, and Hugo Weaving in the roles that brought them to wide public recognition.

Biography
Apps was born in 1955 and from 1967 until 1973 he attended Newington College. In the 1970s Apps began his working life as an actor. He appeared in the films The Chant of Jimmie Blacksmith, Mad Dog Morgan and Sunday Too Far Away and on stage in the original Melbourne/Adelaide production of The Rocky Horror Show. In 1982 he first started casting at the ABC Melbourne. He has since cast TV commercials, TV series and over 70 feature films. For seven years he was on the board of the Australian Film Institute and he is the current president of the Casting Guild of Australia. Apps is married to Australian actress and casting director Robyn Gibbes.

References

Australian casting directors
People from Sydney
Living people
1955 births
People educated at Newington College